Michaëlla Krajicek was the defending champion, but lost in the quarterfinals to Alison Van Uytvanck.

Mandy Minella won the title, defeating Verónica Cepede Royg in the final, 6–4, 7–5.

Seeds

Main draw

Finals

Top half

Bottom half

References 
 Main draw

Coleman Vision Tennis Championships - Singles